William Gordon Young (15 June 1904 – 6 September 1974) was an Australian physical culturist and public servant. Young was born in Guelph, Ontario, Canada and died in Marrickville, Sydney, New South Wales.

References

1904 births
1974 deaths
Australian public servants
Canadian emigrants to Australia
People associated with physical culture
People from Guelph